Michał Wielhorski h. Kierdeja (c. 1730 – 1794) was a Polish noble, official, politician, diplomat and writer. He was the Lithuanian Master of the Kitchen in the years 1763–1774, Lithuanian Great Quartermaster in 1758–1762, starost and envoy of the Bar Confederation to France.

Family
He married Elżbieta Ogińska and was the father of three sons.

Michał Wielhorski (1755–1805), general, husband of Celina Przeuska h. Sulima and Aleksandra Kurdwanowska h. Półkozic
Jerzy Wielhorski (1755–1809), field clerk of Lithuania
Józef Wielhorski  (1759–1817), general

Bibliography

1730 births
1794 deaths
Bar confederates
18th-century Polish nobility
Polish diplomats
Members of the Sejm of the Polish–Lithuanian Commonwealth
Government officials of the Polish–Lithuanian Commonwealth
Michal
Recipients of the Order of the White Eagle (Poland)